Akpınar is a village in the Adıyaman District, Adıyaman Province, Turkey. The village is populated by Kurds and had a population of 716 in 2021.

The hamlets of Çakmak, Çınar, Harabe, Küçük Boyalı, Maloğlu and Nacar are attached to Akpınar.

References

Villages in Adıyaman District
Kurdish settlements in Adıyaman Province